Daniel James Moloney (14 October 1909 – 26 June 1963) was an Irish Fianna Fáil politician who served as a senator for the Industrial and Commercial Panel from 1961 to 1963 and a Teachta Dála (TD) for the Kerry North constituency from 1957 to 1961.

A former motor trader, Moloney was elected to Dáil Éireann on his first attempt, at the 1957 general election, taking his seat in the 16th Dáil. The seat had been won at the previous election for Clann na Poblachta by Johnny Connor, and retained at the by-election after Connor's death by his daughter Kathleen O'Connor, who did not stand in 1957.

The Kerry North constituency was reduced from four seats to three at the 1961 general election, and Moloney was the only outgoing TD not to be re-elected. His Fianna Fáil colleague Tom McEllistrim was returned to the 17th Dáil, the other seats going to Labour Party's Dan Spring and the independent TD Patrick Finucane.

After the loss of his Dáil seat, Moloney was elected to the 10th Seanad as a senator for the Industrial and Commercial Panel. Howevever, he died two years later, on 26 June 1963, and the by-election for his seat in the Seanad was won by John Costelloe.

References

1909 births
1963 deaths
Fianna Fáil TDs
Members of the 16th Dáil
Members of the 10th Seanad
Fianna Fáil senators